Tina Gharavi is an Iranian-born British-American BAFTA and Sundance nominated artist, director and screenwriter. Gharavi is known for her innovative cross-platform stories about outsiders, misfits and rebels as well as people in extraordinary situations. According to The Spectator, Gharavi's work is simultaneously intimate and lyrical, as well as poignant and political.

Her debut, I Am Nasrine, was nominated for a BAFTA. Sir Ben Kingsley called it "an important and much-needed film" and Peter Bradshaw of The Guardian gave the film 4 stars, writing that it was "a valuable debut, shot with a fluent kind of poetry." Gharavi has TV credits to her name including directing on The Tunnel, the UK equivalent of The Bridge for Sky and Ackley Bridge for Channel 4. She is showrunner for an Icelandic/British Detective series, Refurinn (The Fox), an adaptation of an Icelandic best-selling detective series by Sólveig Pálsdóttir.

Gharavi's award-winning work has been broadcast worldwide on the BBC, Channel 4 (UK), ITV, Showtime, Educational Broadcasting System South Korea, and in the contemporary art world, including multiple screenings at the ICA in London, the BALTIC Centre for Contemporary Art (UK). Her films are housed in the permanent collections of MIT, Museum of Fine Arts Boston, British Film Institute, Harvard University Library, Tyne & Wear Archives, Manchester Art Gallery, and the Donnell Library in New York amongst others.

She was awarded a National Endowment for the Arts Fellowship, received a UK Arts Council Decibel Spotlight Award and served as a diversity champion for a variety of organisations (UK Refugee Council, Arts Council North-East, Tyneside Cinema and BALTIC Centre for Contemporary Arts). Gharavi is an Associate Professor in Film & Digital Media at the University of Newcastle. She was invited to join the BAFTA Academy in 2017 and received a Fellowship from the MIT Documentary Lab in Boston.

Early life and education
Born in Tehran, Gharavi lives in the UK and Los Angeles. She is a global citizen; raised in the Iran, New Zealand, and New Jersey. Gharavi attended high school in suburban New Jersey, spending part of her life in Red Bank, close to the Jersey Shore. Gharavi initially trained as a painter at the Mason Gross School of the Arts at Rutgers University. She later studied in France at Le Fresnoy studio national des arts contemporains. She currently splits her time between Newcastle, England and Venice Beach, California.

Production
Gharavi established the film company, Bridge + Tunnel Productions, based in Newcastle upon Tyne, England in 1998.  
In 2000, Gharavi set up the Kooch Cinema Group, a media training project, for asylum seekers and refugee participants; a project started after returning to Iran to make a Channel Four commissioned documentary, Mother/Country, where she revisited her mother's house after 23 years. In 2005, she established a separate media charity, Bridge + Tunnel Voices, to undertake the charitable and educational work she initiated mainly working with refugees and asylum seekers; stepping down as the lead creative director in 2015. In 2014, she co-established Bridge + Tunnel France in Paris, with James Richard Baillie, to specialise in European co-productions. In 2019, she set up Which Witch, a new banner to undertake long form TV drama.

Selected filmography

References

External links

Living people
1972 births
Iranian film directors
British film directors
British directors
American film directors
New Zealand film directors
Iranian women film directors
British women film directors
Iranian emigrants to the United Kingdom
Iranian emigrants to the United States
People from Tehran
Women screenwriters